The Journal of Value Inquiry is a peer-reviewed philosophical journal focused on value studies. It was founded in 1967 by James Wilbur. The journal publishes essays, letters, book reviews, interviews, dialogues, reports, and news.

According to the Journal Citation Reports, the journal has a 2015 impact factor of 0.373, ranking it 43rd out of 51 journals in the category "Ethics".

See also 
 List of ethics journals

References

External links 
JVI website

Philosophy journals
Ethics journals
Publications established in 1967
Aesthetics journals